The 2018 Mediterranean Athletics U23 Championships was an athletics competition which was held in Jesolo, Italy, from 9 to 10 June 2018. A total of 42 events were contested, of which 21 by male and 21 by female athletes. A total of 25 nations participated in the championships.

Medal summary

Men

Women

Medal table
 Host

References

Mediterranean Athletics U23 Championships
International athletics competitions hosted by Italy
Sport in Veneto
Mediterranean U23 Championships
Mediterranean U23 Championships
Mediterranean U23 Championships